The Well Equidistributed Long-period Linear (WELL) is a family of pseudorandom number generators developed in 2006 by François Panneton, Pierre L'Ecuyer, and . It is a form of linear-feedback shift register optimized for software implementation on a 32-bit machine.

Operational design 
The structure is similar to the Mersenne Twister, a large state made up of previous output words (32 bits each), from which a new output word is generated using linear recurrences modulo 2 over a finite binary field .  However, a more complex recurrence produces a denser generator polynomial, producing better statistical properties.

Each step of the generator reads five words of state: the oldest 32 bits (which may straddle a word boundary if the state size is not a multiple of 32), the newest 32 bits, and three other words in between. 

Then a series of eight single-word transformations (mostly of the form  and six exclusive-or operations combine those into two words, which become the newest two words of state, one of which will be the output.

Variants 

Specific parameters are provided for the following generators:
 WELL512a
 WELL521a, WELL521b
 WELL607a, WELL607b
 WELL800a, WELL800b
 WELL1024a, WELL1024b
 WELL19937a, WELL19937b, WELL19937c
 WELL21701a
 WELL23209a, WELL23209b
 WELL44497a, WELL44497b.  

Numbers give the state size in bits; letter suffixes denote variants of the same size.

Implementations 

 Implementations of WELL512a, WELL1024a, WELL19937a, WELL19937c, WELL44497a, WELL44497b in C (Free for non-commercial use)
 Implementations of same algorithms in Scala
 Implementations in C++
 Implementations of WELL512, WELL1024, WELL607 in Java
 Implementations of WELL512, WELL1024 in BBC BASIC
 Modified "maximally equidistributed" implementations of WELL19937, WELL44497 in C (Free for non-commercial use)
  Implementation of WELL512 in C (Public Domain)

References

External links 
  The academic paper, and related articles by François Panneton
 Pierre L'Ecuyer's publications

Pseudorandom number generators